Kindral is the Estonian word for General which is also the highest military position in the Republic of Estonia. Both Ground Force and Air Force superior officers ranks share the same names which have been combined with the military rank of general and other senior officer ranks. There are four types of generals in the Estonia Defence Forces.

Estonian superior officers
 Kindral (General)

 Kindralleitnant (Lieutenant General)

 Kindralmajor (Major General)

 Brigaadikindral (Brigadier/Brigadier General)

Notable Generals
1939: Johan Laidoner  (1884–1953)
1995: Aleksander Einseln (1931–2017)
2011: Ants Laaneots (born 1948)
2017: Riho Terras (born 1967)

See also
Military of Estonia

References

External links
Estonian Defence Forces
Estonian Ministry of Defence 

Military ranks of Estonia